Stean Hainsworth (born 22 December 1965) is a New Zealand cricketer. He played in one first-class match for Wellington in 1988/89.

See also
 List of Wellington representative cricketers

References

External links
 

1965 births
Living people
New Zealand cricketers
Wellington cricketers
Sportspeople from Upper Hutt